Jarrad Anderson (born 7 March 1980) is an Australian former professional rugby league footballer who played for the Cronulla-Sutherland Sharks in the NRL.

Anderson, who played his junior football at Canterbury, spent his early career in Queensland at Brisbane Norths, which were a feeder club to the Melbourne Storm. His elder brother, Ben Anderson, played first-grade for Melbourne.

Recruited to Cronulla from NSW First Division side Western Suburbs, Anderson made his NRL debut in round 13 of the 2003 NRL season. The club at the time was coached by his father, former Canterbury player Chris Anderson. He remained in the team for the remainder of the season, initially playing as a centre, before switching to the wing. Having taken over goal-kicking duties from Brett Kimmorley, Anderson finished the season as Cronulla's top point-scorer. 

In 2004 he left Cronulla for the Canterbury-Bankstown Bulldogs. The decision by Cronulla officials not to offer Anderson a contract for the 2004 season caused a rift between his father and the club.

References

External links
Jarrad Anderson at Rugby League project

1980 births
Living people
Australian rugby league players
Rugby league players from Sydney
Cronulla-Sutherland Sharks players
Rugby league centres
Rugby league wingers
Norths Devils players
Western Suburbs Magpies NSW Cup players